Jose Almir Barros Neto, known as Almir is Brazilian Footballer who currently plays for Negeri Sembilan.

External links
Player Profile
 

1985 births
Living people
Brazilian footballers
Brazilian expatriate footballers
Americano Futebol Clube players
Campinense Clube players
Goiás Esporte Clube players
Vila Nova Futebol Clube players
Gyeongnam FC players
Goyang Zaicro FC players
Ulsan Hyundai FC players
Negeri Sembilan FA players
Gangwon FC players
K League 2 players
K League 1 players
Expatriate footballers in South Korea
Brazilian expatriate sportspeople in South Korea
Association football forwards
Sportspeople from Ceará